Orlovka is a rural locality (a village) in Ilchigulovsky Selsoviet, Uchalinsky District, Bashkortostan, Russia. The population was 243 in 2010. There are seven streets.

Geography 
Orlovka is located 67 km northeast of Uchaly (the district's administrative centre) by road. Ilchigulovo is the nearest rural locality.

References 

Rural localities in Uchalinsky District